His Majesty's or HM Armed Smack Inverlyon was a fishing smack that was converted to a Q-ship during the First World War. Q-ships served as decoys to lure German submarines near enough so that concealed weapons could be brought to bear and sink the submarines. On 15 August 1915, Inverlyon succeeded in luring German submarine  within range and sinking her with nine shots from her gun. The Royal Navy Gunner in command of the vessel, Ernest Martin Jehan, received the Distinguished Service Cross and members of Inverlyons crew shared the bounty offered for German submarines.

Career

Inverlyon was a fishing smack of 59 tons burthen that was a part of the fishing fleet at Lowestoft on the Suffolk coast. The wooden boat had a flush deck, two masts, and no engine. Inverlyons sails were fore-and-aft rigged and may have been red ochre in colour, the traditional sail colour for British smacks.

In February 1915, Germany began its first submarine offensive of the First World War. During this campaign, enemy vessels in the German-defined war zone, which encompassed all waters around the United Kingdom, were to be sunk, and the British fishing fleet was not exempt. In mid-June, for example, the German submarine  had sunk six smacks off Lowestoft in a two-day period.

One method devised to deal with U-boat attacks was the decoy or Q-ship, designed to lure submarines that were targeting merchant shipping close enough that concealed guns or other weapons could sink them. Inverlyon was selected to become a Q-ship, was outfitted with either a 3-pounder (47 mm) or a 6-pounder (57 mm) gun, and entered the service of the Royal Navy on 2 August 1915. Inverlyons fishing crew and skipper were all temporarily inducted into the Trawler section of the Royal Naval Reserve. Regular Royal Navy Gunner Ernest Martin Jehan and three other gunners from —a former torpedo boat operating as a minesweeper from Lowestoft—were assigned to Inverlyon, with Jehan in command.

This attack was probably by UB-4, because she was operating in that area on her fourteenth patrol. Regardless of the identity of Bona Fides attacker, UB-4 did approach a group of smacks in the vicinity the next day. Unknown to UB-4s commander, Oberleutnant zur See Karl Gross, one of the fishing vessels was the disguised Inverlyon.

Around 20:20, UB-4 surfaced near Inverlyon, and Gross, on the conning tower of UB-4, began shouting out commands to Inverlyons crew in German. Jehan, after waiting until UB-4 closed to within  of Inverlyon, ordered the White Ensign raised and gave the command to open fire. A burst of three rounds from the Inverlyons weapon scored hits on the conning tower, the second shot destroying part of the bridge and sending Gross into the water. UB-4, with no one at the helm, drifted behind Inverlyon, and when clear, Inverlyons gunner unleashed another six shots into the hull of UB-4 at point-blank range. All the while, small arms fire from Inverlyons crew peppered the submarine.  The U-boat began going down by the bow, becoming nearly vertical before disappearing below the surface. Inverlyons fishing skipper, a man named Phillips, dived in to attempt the rescue of a crewman from UB-4.  Phillips was unable to reach him before the crewman went under and met same fate as Gross and UB-4s twelve other crewmen.

As UB-4 went down she fouled Inverlyons nets—which had been deployed to keep up the appearance of a real fishing boat—essentially anchoring Inverlyon in place. The Q-ship's crew, not having a wireless set on board, sent word of the encounter with another smack.  This was followed up by releasing messenger pigeons the following morning, requesting instructions on what to do with UB-4. The thought of salvaging the snagged U-boat was rejected, so the nets were cut, freeing UB-4 to sink to the bottom. UB-4s wreck lies at position . On 19 November 1915 Jehan was awarded the Distinguished Service Cross (DSC) for the sinking of UB-4, and the crewmen of Inverlyon split the submarine bounty paid by the Admiralty.

About three weeks after she sank UB-4, Inverlyon had the opportunity to sink another U-boat, but was unsuccessful. By 1916, Inverlyon had ended her short-lived Q-ship career and returned to being a fishing boat. Jehan, in addition to his DSC, was subsequently specially promoted to lieutenant on 4 January 1916 for his war service; he retired from the Royal Navy on 29 October 1920.

On 1 February 1917, the German submarine  shelled and sank Inverlyon  from Trevose Head at position ; there were no reported casualties.

See also
 , a sail-rigged vessel that served with distinction during World War I.
 , a sail rigged Q-ship used by the US Navy during World War II
 , one of the last sail-rigged vessels to see combat in World War II.
 , a topsail schooner in which Lieutenant William Sanders earned the Victoria Cross for an action with  during World War I

Notes

References

Bibliography

  
 
 
 

Fishing vessels of the United Kingdom
Q-ships of the Royal Navy
World War I patrol vessels of the United Kingdom
Maritime incidents in 1917
Ships sunk by German submarines in World War I
World War I shipwrecks in the Atlantic Ocean